Karen Leigh Prell (born July 26, 1959) is an American puppeteer and animator. She is the performer of Red Fraggle in Fraggle Rock.

Early life and career
Prell was born on July 26, 1959 in Florida but grew up in Seattle, Washington. She also performed some characters in other Jim Henson films and has enjoyed a significant second career as a computer animator for such studios as Pixar and DNA. On Sesame Street, she performed Deena Monster, as well as several background and one-off characters. She performed on the show from 1980–1981 for seasons 11 and 12, then returned in 2019 for season 50. She also performed in the 2003 attraction Sesame Street 4-D Movie Magic. Her website includes notes about working with Jim Henson and pictures of her custom puppets.

She was an animator for Geri’s Game and also worked on animation of A Bug's Life and Toy Story 2.

Prell also works as an animator with Valve.

Outside of her works on shows, Prell has made public appearances performing Red Fraggle, like appearances at Comic Con. At Dragon Con 2013, Karen Prell was joined by fellow puppeteer Kathryn Mullen as part of the 30th Anniversary of Fraggle Rock where they performed their respective characters. She returned to perform Red Fraggle again for the 2020 Apple TV+ reboot Fraggle Rock: Rock On!, and the upcoming reboot of the series, of which she is also co-executive producer.

Personal life
Prell married fellow Muppet performer Mike Quinn. They lived for a decade in England before moving to California to work for Pixar. Since divorcing in 2004, Prell and Quinn have continued to work together on different projects, usually involving the Muppets.

Filmography

Television
 Fraggle Rock – Red Fraggle, Wingnut Doozer, Fluffinella, Baby Tree Creature, Beastie,  Gavel Doozer, Marley Fraggle, Modem Doozer, Additional Muppets
 Jim Henson's Animal Show – Ollie the Tapir, Tizzie the Bee (1994–1995), Alexis the Giraffe, Arlene the Aardvark, Bernice the Warthog, Blanche the Manatee, Charlotte the Penguin, Hettie the Hedgehog, Hillary the Owl, Kasey the Kangaroo, Leah the Fruit Bat, Lydia the Ostrich, Rhonda the Raccoon
 Jim Henson's Mother Goose Stories – Yellow ,  (in "Tommy Tucker"), Little Boy Blue's Mother (in "Boy Blue"),  (in "Boy Blue"), Topiary Peacock (in "Dicky Birds"), Peter the Dicky  (in "Dicky Birds"), Old Mother Hubbard (in "Mother Hubbard"), Peter's Wife (in "Peter, Peter Pumpkin Eater")
 Sesame Street – Deena, Masha, Additional Muppets
 The Ghost of Faffner Hall – Mimi
 The Muppet Show – Robin (episode 108),  (episode 103), Additional Muppets
 Fraggle Rock: Rock On! – Red Fraggle
 Fraggle Rock: Back to the Rock – Red Fraggle, Icy Joe, Queen of the Merggles (puppetry)

Film
 A Muppet Family Christmas – Red Fraggle, Maureen the Mink
 Dreamchild – Dormouse (puppeteer)
 Labyrinth – Firey 2 (lead puppeteer), The Junk Lady (puppeteer), The Worm (puppeteer), Helping Hands, Goblins (puppetry only)
 Muppet Treasure Island – Additional Muppets
 The Fantastic Miss Piggy Show – Additional Muppets
 The Muppet Christmas Carol – Daughter Mouse, Performer of Ghost of Christmas Past, Aretha
 The Muppets – Additional Muppets
 The Muppets Take Manhattan – Yolanda Rat, Frank the Dog
 The Tale of the Bunny Picnic – Babble Bunny, Baby Bunny, Great-Grandmother Bunny

Events
 The Muppets Take the Bowl – Additional Muppet Performer (live show at the Hollywood Bowl, 8–10 Sept. 2017)
 The Muppets Take the O2 – Additional Muppet Performer (live show at the O2 Arena, 13–14 Jul. 2018)

Animator

Film
 Geri's Game
 A Bug's Life
 Toy Story 2 (additional storyboard artist)
 For the Birds
 Monsters, Inc.
 The League of Extraordinary Gentlemen (character animator)
 Son of the Mask
 The Ant Bully (character animator)
 Enchanted (character animator)

Video Games
 Team Fortress 2
 Left 4 Dead
 Left 4 Dead 2
 Portal 2 (lead animator on Wheatley and corrupted cores)
 Half-Life: Alyx

References

External links
 Karen Prell's web site
 

1959 births
Animators from Florida
American women animators
Fraggle Rock performers
Living people
Muppet performers
Sesame Street Muppeteers
Pixar people